Edward Hanna may refer to:
 Edward Joseph Hanna (1860–1944), archbishop of San Francisco from 1915 to 1935
 Edward A. Hanna (1922–2009), former mayor of Utica, New York